Jerry Fisher was an American Negro league pitcher in the 1900s and 1910s.

Fisher played for the Philadelphia Giants from 1908 to 1911. In 17 recorded games on the mound, he posted a 4.06 ERA in 126.1 innings.

References

External links
Baseball statistics and player information from Baseball-Reference Black Baseball Stats and Seamheads

Year of birth missing
Year of death missing
Place of birth missing
Place of death missing
Philadelphia Giants players
Baseball pitchers